The Days is a Canadian short drama film, directed by Maxime Giroux and released in 2006. The film stars Gildor Roy as a grieving father going through a rapid cycle of emotions after his daughter is found dead in the forest.

The film's cast also includes Martin Dubreuil, Denise Charest and Clément Sasseville.

The film premiered at the 2006 Toronto International Film Festival, where it won the award for Best Canadian Short Film. It was subsequently a Jutra Award nominee for Best Live Action Short Film at the 9th Jutra Awards in 2007.

References

External links

2006 films
2006 short films
Films directed by Maxime Giroux
French-language Canadian films
Canadian drama short films
2000s Canadian films